SpVgg Bayern Hof is a German association football club based in Hof, Bavaria. The club was founded on 1 June 1910 as Ballspielclub Hof, but within a year was renamed Britannia Hof. In 1913, they merged with FC Roland Hof and FC Phoenix Hof to become FC Bayern Hof.

History

FC Bayern Hof was a decent, but unremarkable, local side through its early decades. It spent five seasons in the tier-one Bezirksliga Bayern from 1927. In 1944, the team won promotion to the Gauliga Bayern, Staffel Oberfranken, one of sixteen top flight division that had been created in 1933 in the re-organization of German football under the Third Reich. However, by that time World War II had overtaken that part of the country and Gauliga play was ended there in the fall.

After the war Bayern Hof advanced to the Landesliga Bayern (II) in 1946 where they came out on top of the Staffel Nordbayern only to lose the divisional playoff to Wacker München (3:4, 0:4). League re-structuring saw the club in the 2. Oberliga Süd (II) to open the 1951–52 season. They remained competitive throughout the decade, generally finishing in the top half of the table.

A second-place result in 1959 put the club into Oberliga Süd (I) to play first division football for the first time. They managed only middling results against the stronger, better established teams there and so did not qualify for play in the Bundesliga – Germany's new professional league – when it was established in 1963. BH played in the Regionalliga Süd (II) and through the late 1960s and into the early 1970s, the team played good football and earned some solid finishes – including a division title in 1968 – but failed in three tries to make it through the promotion rounds to the new top division in 1967, 1968 and 1972.

In the pre-season 1969–70 Bayern Hof had a taste of international football as they took part in the 1969 Cup of the Alps. They hosted three games at their Stadion Grüne Au against Hellas Verona, Lausanne Sports and Bologna.

In 1978, they slipped to the tier-three Bayernliga and began a descent that would land them in Landesliga Bayern-Nord (IV) by 1980. In the next fourteen seasons until 1994, the club existed as an elevator side between the Landesliga and Oberliga, playing in the later in 1983–84 and 1988–1990 while generally finishing in the top-three in the Landesliga in the other seasons. It made a more permanent return to the Oberliga Bayern in 1994, when the new Regionalliga Süd was formed and the best teams from the Bayernliga entered the new league.

A decade in the Bayernliga saw the club finish fourth three times, in 1996, 2000 and 2002, but, in 2004, it was relegated again. In 2005 FC Bayern Hof merged with SpVgg Hof to form SpVgg Bayern Hof. SpVgg Hof had been formed in 1893 as the football department of the gymnastics club TV Hof, itself founded in 1861. The footballers became independent in 1924 and were distinguished only by single season appearances in the top flight in 1921 and 1929, and an advance to the Amateurliga Bayern for the 1966–67 season.

In 2006 the newly unified club captured the division title in the Landesliga Bayern-Nord (V) and were promoted to the fourth division Bayernliga. A difficult 2007–08 season saw the club in deep relegation trouble all season but eventually they managed to climb one rank above the relegation zone and survive.

After two better seasons, the club once more played against relegation in 2010–11, having to face SpVgg Bayreuth in a decider, which Hof won 2–1 in extra time to qualify for the Bayernliga promotion round against the Landesliga runners-up. In this game, a 1–0 victory over Jahn Regensburg II proved enough to maintain its league status. The following season, Hof was a strong contender for the league title, eventually coming second to TSV 1860 Rosenheim and earning promotion to the new Regionalliga Bayern. The club was however criticised by the BFV for its desolate second team who, uniquely for a Regionalliga team, was relegated from the ninth tier in 2011–12 and completely withdrawn for 2012–13. Hof answered this with an open letter to the association, pointing out the club's excellent and extensive youth program and the fact that fielding a second team would still cost it €60,000 to 80,000 per season in the Bezirksliga, an amount the club was unwilling to spend. In the 2012–13 season the club had to struggle against relegation all season and beyond, having to defend its league place in the relegation round with the Bayernliga runners-up. In a two-leg play-off against TSV Großbardorf Hof defended its league place with an aggregate score of 8–4. the following season the club finished 17th once more but this time was directly relegated back to the Bayernliga. Hof finished third in the Bayernliga in 2015–16 and qualified for the promotion round to the Regionaliga where it defeated Viktoria Aschaffenburg and returned to the fourth tier.

Squad

Honours
The club's honours:

League
 2. Oberliga Süd (II)
 Runners-up: 1959
 Regionalliga Süd (II)
 Champions: 1968
 Runners-up (2): 1967, 1972
 Landesliga Bayern (II)
 Champions: 1947
 Runners-up: 1950
 Bayernliga
 Runners-up: 2012
 Landesliga Bayern-Nord
 Champions (5): 1966‡, 1983, 1988, 1994, 2006
 Runners-up (2): 1993, 2005
 2. Amateurliga Oberfranken Ost (IV)
 Champions: 1955‡

Cup
 German Cup
 Last sixteen:  1975–76
 Oberfranken Cup
 Winner (3): 1996, 2000, 2004

Youth
 Bavarian Under 19 championship
 Runners-up: 1951
 Under 15 Bayernliga
 Runners-up: 2014
‡ Marks championships won by SpVgg Hof, all others by Bayern Hof.

Recent managers
Recent managers of the club:

Recent seasons
The recent season-by-season performance of the club:

SpVgg Bayern Hof

SpVgg Bayern Hof II

With the introduction of the Bezirksoberligas in 1988 as the new fifth tier, below the Landesligas, all leagues below dropped one tier. With the introduction of the Regionalligas in 1994 and the 3. Liga in 2008 as the new third tier, below the 2. Bundesliga, all leagues below dropped one tier. With the establishment of the Regionalliga Bayern as the new fourth tier in Bavaria in 2012 the Bayernliga was split into a northern and a southern division, the number of Landesligas expanded from three to five and the Bezirksoberligas abolished. All leagues from the Bezirksligas onwards were elevated one tier.

DFB Cup appearances
The club has qualified for the first round of the German Cup a number of times:

Source:

References

External links
Official team site
Abseits Guide to German Soccer
Bayern Hof at Weltfussball.de

Football clubs in Germany
Football clubs in Bavaria
Bayern Hof
Association football clubs established in 1910
Football in Upper Franconia
1910 establishments in Germany
2. Bundesliga clubs